Rob-e Kohan (also Romanized as Rob‘-e Kohan) is a village in Ravar Rural District, in the Central District of Ravar County, Kerman Province, Iran. At the 2006 census, its population was 17, in 4 families.

References 

Populated places in Ravar County